A bindi (Hindi: बिंदी, from Sanskrit बिन्दु bindú meaning "point, drop, dot or small particle") or pottu is a coloured dot or, in modern times, a sticker worn on the center of the forehead, originally by Hindus, Jains, Buddhists and Sikhs from the Indian subcontinent.

A bindi is a bright dot of some colour applied in the centre of the forehead close to the eyebrows or in the middle of the forehead, worn in the Indian subcontinent (particularly amongst Hindus in India, Pakistan, Bangladesh, Nepal, Bhutan and Sri Lanka) and Southeast Asia among Balinese, Filipino, Javanese, Sundanese, Malaysian, Singaporean, Vietnamese and Burmese Hindus. A similar marking is also worn by babies and children in China and, as in the Indian subcontinent and Southeast Asia, represents the opening of the third eye. Bindi in Hinduism, Buddhism, and Jainism is associated with ajna chakra, and Bindu is known as the third eye chakra. Bindu is the point or dot around which the mandala is created, representing the universe. The bindi has a historical and cultural presence in the region of Greater India.

Religious significance

Traditionally, the area between the eyebrows (where the bindi is placed) is said to be the sixth chakra, ajna, the seat of "concealed wisdom". The bindi is said to retain energy and strengthen concentration. The bindi also represents the third eye. 
The Nasadiya Sukta of the Rig Veda, the earliest known Sanskrit text, mentions the word Bindu.

The Ajna is symbolised by a sacred lotus with two petals, and corresponds to the colours violet, indigo or deep blue, though it is traditionally described as white. It is at this point that the two sides Nadi Ida (yoga) and Pingala are said to terminate and merge with the central channel Sushumna, signifying the end of duality, the characteristic of being dual (e.g. light and dark, or male and female). The seed syllable for this chakra is the syllable OM, and the presiding deity is Ardhanarishvara, who is a half male, half female Shiva/Shakti. The Shakti goddess of Ajna is called Hakini. In metaphysics, Bindu is considered the dot or point at which creation begins and may become unity. It is also described as "the sacred symbol of the cosmos in its unmanifested state". Bindu is the point around which the mandala is created, representing the universe. Ajna (along with Bindu), is known as the third eye chakra and is linked to the pineal gland which may inform a model of its envisioning. The pineal gland is a light sensitive gland that produces the hormone melatonin which regulates sleep and waking up, and is also postulated to be the production site of the psychedelic dimethyltryptamine, the only known hallucinogen endogenous to the human body. Ajna's key issues involve balancing the higher and lower selves and trusting inner guidance. Ajna's inner aspect relates to the access of intuition. Mentally, Ajna deals with visual consciousness. Emotionally, Ajna deals with clarity on an intuitive level.

In Hinduism, Buddhism, and Jainism, bindi is associated with Ajna Chakra and Bindu. Divinities in these religions are typically depicted with Bhrumadhya Bindu, in meditative pose with their eyes nearly closed show the gaze focused between eyebrows, other spot being the tip of the nose—Naasikagra. The very spot between the eyebrows known as Bhrumadhya is where one focuses one's sight, so that it helps concentration. In South Asia, bindi is worn by women of all religious dispositions and is not restricted to religion or region. However, the Islamic Research Foundation, located in India, says "wearing a bindi or mangalsutra is a sign of Hindu women. The traditional bindi still represents and preserves the symbolic significance that is integrated into Indian mythology in many parts of India."

The red bindi has multiple meanings:
 
 One simple interpretation is that it is a cosmetic mark used to enhance beauty.
 Archaeology has yielded clay female figurines from the Indus Valley with red pigment on the forehead and hair parting. It is unclear whether this held any religious or cultural significance.
 In Hinduism, the colour red represents honour, love, and prosperity, hence it was worn to symbolise these aspects.
 In meditation, the point between the eyebrows (Bhrumadhya) is where one focuses one's sight, to help concentration. Most images of Hindu, Jain or Buddhist divinities in meditative poses with their eyes nearly closed show the gaze focused between the eyebrows (another spot being the tip of the nose—naasikagra).
 Swami Muktananda writes that "auspicious Kumkuma or sandalwood paste is applied (between the eyebrows) out of respect for the inner Guru. It is the Guru's seat. There is a chakra (center of spiritual energy within the human body) here called Ajna (Aadnyaa) chakra, meaning 'Command center'. Here is received the Guru's command to go higher in Sadhana (spiritual practice) to the 'Sahasraar' (seventh and final chakra) which leads to Self-realisation. The flame seen at the eyebrow is called 'Guru Jyoti'."
 The encyclopaedic Dictionary of Yoga reports that this 'Ajna Chakra' is also called the 'Third eye'. This center is connected with the sacred syllable 'Om' and presiding, is 'Parashiva'. On activating this center, the aspirant overcomes 'Ahankāra' (the ego or sense of individuality), the last stop on the path of spirituality.

Traditional application method

A traditional bindi is red or maroon in colour. A pinch of vermilion powder is applied with a ring-finger to make a dot. A small annular disc aids application for beginners. First, a sticky wax paste is applied through the empty centre of the disc. This is then covered with kumkum or vermilion and then the disc is removed to get a round bindi. Various materials such as lac, sandal, 'aguru', mica, 'kasturi', kumkum (made of red turmeric) and sindoor color the dot. Saffron ground together with 'kusumba' flower can also work. Traditionally they are green in color with a red dot in the middle. The bindi is no longer restricted in color or shape.

Historically, the ornamental bindi spangle consists of a small piece of lac over which is smeared vermilion, while above it a piece of mica or thin glass is fixed for ornament. Women wore large spangles set in gold with a border of jewels if they could afford it. The bindi was made and sold by lac workers known as Lakhera. In Hinduism, it's part of the Suhāg or lucky trousseau at marriages and is affixed to the girl's forehead on her wedding and thereafter always worn.  Unmarried girls optionally wore small ornamental spangles on their foreheads. A widow was not allowed to wear bindi or any ornamentation associated with married women. In modern times, self-adhesive bindis are available in various materials, usually made of felt or thin metal and adhesive on the other side. These are simple to apply, disposable substitutes for older lac tikli bindis. Sticker bindis come in many colours, designs, materials, and sizes.

There are different regional variations of the bindi. In Maharashtra a large crescent moon shaped bindi is worn with a smaller black dot underneath or above, associated with Chandrabindu and Bindu chakra represented by crescent moon, they are commonly known as Chandrakor in this region, outside Maharashtra they are popularly known as Marathi bindi. In Bengal region a large round red bindi is worn, brides in this region are often decorated with Alpana design on forehead and cheeks, along with bindi. In southern India a smaller red bindi is worn with a white tilak at the bottom, another common type is a red tilak shaped bindi. In Rajasthan the bindi is often worn round, long tilak shaped bindi are also common, as well as the crescent moon on some occasions. Decorative bindis have become popular among women in South Asia, regardless of religious background. Bindis are a staple and symbolic for women in the Indian subcontinent.

In addition to the bindi, in India, a vermilion mark in the parting of the hair just above the forehead is worn by married women as commitment to long-life and well-being of their husbands. During all Hindu marriage ceremonies, the groom applies sindoor in the part in the bride's hair.

Apart from their cosmetic use, bindis have found a modern medical application in India. Iodine patch bindis have often been used among women in north-west Maharashtra to battle iodine deficiency.

Related customs in other Asian regions

In Southeast Asia, bindis are worn by the Balinese, Javanese, and Sundanese people of Indonesia. For example, bindis are often worn by brides and grooms in Java and other parts of Indonesia, regardless of their religious beliefs.

The Indonesian practice of wearing a bindi originated from the cultural influence brought about by the Indianized Hindu kingdoms that once ruled Indonesia. Historically, other Indianized kingdoms in Southeast Asia also took part in this practice.

Modern use

Bindis are sometimes worn purely for decorative purpose or style statement without any religious or cultural affiliation. Decorative and ornamental bindis were introduced to other parts of the world by immigrants from the Indian subcontinent. International celebrities such as Gwen Stefani, Julia Roberts, Madonna, Selena Gomez and many others have been seen wearing bindis. The appropriateness of such uses has been disputed.  Reacting to Gomez wearing a bindi while singing her song "Come and Get It", Hindu leader Rajan Zed said that the bindi has religious significance and should not be used as a fashion accessory, but Indian actress Priyanka Chopra praised Gomez's choice as "an embrace of Indian culture". Additionally, several rappers have adopted jewelled bindis, most notably Lil Uzi Vert, who debuted a $24 million pink diamond bindi in February 2021. They were inspired by Lil B who wore a diamond bindi in 2012.

Bindis are part of Bangladeshi culture and women in Bangladesh, irrespective of their religion, adorn themselves with bindis as an ethnic practice. In Pakistan, bindis are worn by some Muslim girls during Eid, though they are ordinarily worn by Hindu women in the Punjab and Sindh.

Alternative terms
A bindi can also be called:
 Phot or Phut (literally meaning a small pressing mark) in Assamese
 Tip (literally meaning "a pressing") in Bengali
 Tikuli (literally meaning "a small tika") in Madhyadeshi areas
 Chandlo (literally meaning moon shape) in Gujarati
 Tilaka in Hindi
 Tika in Nepali
 Kunkuma or Bottu or Tilaka in Kannada
 Tilakaya in Sinhala
 Tikli in Konkani
 Kunkoo or Tikali  in Marathi
 Tikili in Odia
 Bindi in Punjabi meaning long red mark
 Pottu or Kunkumam or Tilakam in Tamil and Malayalam
 Bottu or Tilakam in Telugu
 Tikli in Maithili

See also
 Tilaka
 Thirunamam
 Urna
Huadian - a traditional Chinese forehead decoration

References

External links

 Bindi design as hobby
 
 Safely Peel Bindis from Packing

Bindi and its significance

 
 

Bangladeshi culture
Body art
Cosmetics
Indian culture
Red symbols
Types of jewellery
Desi culture

fr:Bindi